Oyuunbilegiin Pürevbaatar (born 23 November 1973) is a Mongolian former wrestler who competed in the 2000 Summer Olympics and in the 2004 Summer Olympics.

References

External links
 

1973 births
Living people
Olympic wrestlers of Mongolia
Wrestlers at the 2000 Summer Olympics
Mongolian male sport wrestlers
Wrestlers at the 2004 Summer Olympics
Asian Games medalists in wrestling
Wrestlers at the 1998 Asian Games
Wrestlers at the 2002 Asian Games
Asian Games gold medalists for Mongolia
Asian Games silver medalists for Mongolia
Medalists at the 1998 Asian Games
Medalists at the 2002 Asian Games
World Wrestling Championships medalists
20th-century Mongolian people
21st-century Mongolian people